KWRY (104.9 FM) is a radio station. Licensed to Rye, Colorado, United States, it serves the Pueblo area. The station is currently owned by Educational Media Foundation, and carries EMF's contemporary worship music Air1 format.

References

External links
 Official website
 

Radio stations established in 2008
2008 establishments in Colorado
Educational Media Foundation radio stations
Air1 radio stations
WRY